William Blackledge (October 19, 1828) was a Democratic-Republican U.S. Congressman from North Carolina between 1803 and 1809 and between 1811 and 1813.

Born in Craven County, North Carolina, Blackledge was a member of the North Carolina House of Commons from 1797 to 1799 before being elected to the 8th United States Congress in 1802. He served three consecutive terms, during which he was one of the House managers for the impeachment of John Pickering. He ran unsuccessfully for re-election in 1808, but served briefly in the state house in 1809 and returned to serve one more term in the 12th United States Congress from 1811 to 1813. He ran for Congress unsuccessfully one final time before retiring from politics.

He owned a thousand acres of land and six slaves.

Blackledge died in Spring Hill, North Carolina in 1828. He was also the father of William Salter Blackledge, who served one term in the 17th United States Congress in the 1820s.

References

Biographies

1767 births
1828 deaths
Members of the North Carolina House of Representatives
Democratic-Republican Party members of the United States House of Representatives from North Carolina
People from Craven County, North Carolina
18th-century American politicians
19th-century American politicians